Pied Piper (Hartley Rathaway) is a supervillain turned superhero appearing in comic books published by DC Comics, and is commonly associated with the superhero the Flash. The character was created by writer John Broome and artist Carmine Infantino, and made his first appearance in The Flash #106 (May 1959).

Piper was originally introduced as a foe of the Flash / Barry Allen and eventually became a member of the Rogues, a criminal association led by Captain Cold which often battled the Flash. During the crossover event Crisis on Infinite Earths, most of the Multiverse was destroyed, which resulted in the DC Universe being rebooted; moreover Barry died, and Wally West took up the mantle of the Flash. Following the events of Crisis, Piper was re-introduced in The Flash (vol. 2)  #20 (December 1988) as having reformed and become a champion for the poor. Soon afterward, he became an ally and personal friend of Wally, and an integral member of the Flash family.

Following the events of Flashpoint, DC Comics rebooted its universe once again and relaunched its titles in 2011, during The New 52 event. Here, Piper is portrayed as a former member of the Rogues, who has given up being a vigilante and is dating David Singh, Barry's Director at the Central City Police Department.

The Pied Piper appeared in first, second, sixth and ninth seasons of The Flash, portrayed by Andy Mientus.

Publication history
Created by John Broome and Carmine Infantino, the character made his first appearance in The Flash #106 (May 1959).

Following the events of Crisis, Piper was revealed to be gay in The Flash (vol. 2) #53 (August 1991).

Fictional character biography
Hartley Rathaway was born deaf and received assistive technology in the form of hearing implants thanks to research funded by his wealthy father (later it was revealed that the implants were made by Dr. Will Magnus). He became obsessed with sound, and pursued little else in life; experimenting with sonic technology, Rathaway eventually invented a technique of hypnotism through music, and a way to cause deadly vibrations. Growing bored with his lifestyle, he turned to crime as the Pied Piper and frequently clashed with Barry Allen, the second Flash.

Reform

After Allen's death during Crisis on Infinite Earths, Hartley retired from crime to become a socialist champion of the poor and underprivileged. He also came out as one of DC's first openly gay characters, and joked that this was ironic, as he was one of the few villains to have ever "gone straight". He first realized he was gay when he became attracted to Rod Lauren when watching The Crawling Hand. Rathaway becomes a good friend of the Flash, Wally West, and his wife Linda, whom he helps with scientific problems.

Sometime later, Piper was arrested for the murder of his parents. Wally was sure Piper could not have committed such an act, but Piper himself seemed to believe himself guilty. Wally eventually discovered that the true murderer was Mirror Master. Unaware of Wally's discovery, Piper broke out of Iron Heights and struck a deal of some sort with former Rogue and FBI agent the Trickster. During this time, Flash asked the Spectre to erase everyone's memories of his secret identity, due to his wife suffering a miscarriage from an attack by Zoom.

It was later revealed that Barry Allen had Zatanna tamper with the mind of supervillain the Top, turning him into a hero (the Top had gone on a murderous rampage and Allen believed this was the only way to stop him from causing more harm). As a hero, the Top went insane over the guilt of his earlier deeds. After Allen had died, Wally received a letter from Barry asking him to restore Top's mind if he ever returned. After Wally had Zatanna restore the Top's mind, the Top revealed that when he had been a hero he had attempted to reprogram many of the other Rogues into heroes as well, including the Pied Piper.

When the 'good' Rogues went after the remaining 'bad', Top returned to undo his brainwashing on the redeemed Rogues. When the Piper battled the Flash, West unmasked himself, triggering a flood of memories of their friendship and causing the Piper to pass out as his mind repaired itself. When he awoke, Piper appeared to be his old self again and came to Linda's aid. Piper remains the only Rogue to no longer be a villain, save for Magenta. He later had all charges for murder cleared.

One Year Later
One Year Later, Pied Piper was seen in the pages of both The Flash (vol. 3), and Countdown teaming with a new group of Rogues led by Inertia. The team of Rogues has him working with his parents' murderer, Mirror Master. Piper reveals that he has rejoined the Rogues with a plan of infiltrating them, but when Captain Cold, Heat Wave, and Weather Wizard successfully murder Bart Allen, he and Trickster are forced on the run together. They are pursued by heroes and villains alike in the form of the Suicide Squad, the Question and Batwoman, Poison Ivy and Deathstroke, and eventually Piper's former friend and the newly returned previous Flash, Wally West. Wally confines the two of them at the wedding of Green Arrow and Black Canary, despite the warnings that Deathstroke is planning an all-out assault at the occasion. They manage to escape the wedding assault, while inadvertently picking up Double Down as a passenger. The trio stop at a diner, only to be attacked by the Suicide Squad. Double Down is captured, but Piper and Trickster, using an invisibility field, decide to follow the Squad and free the other captured villains. After encountering and freeing Two-Face, Piper and Trickster are again attacked by Deadshot, who pursues them relentlessly until he succeeds in murdering Trickster. With Trickster's death, the cuffs activate a 24-hour self-destruct, which Piper is able to delay with his flute. When the train they are on is submitted to a border check, Piper flees into the desert. Delirious from the heat, he begins to imagine Trickster's corpse is talking to him. After severing the hand from the rest of the corpse, Piper is brought to Apokolips by DeSaad. Desaad unlocks the shackles, and claims that Piper can channel the Anti-Life Equation and control the planet. Before the Piper can do so, Brother Eye finishes assimilating Apokolips.

DeSaad finally gets into Brother Eye's control and convinces Piper to play his flute to activate the Anti-Life Equation. Piper agrees to play, but upon hearing that DeSaad was the mastermind behind his recent misfortune, in an almost successful attempt to break his spirit and take control of him, he kills DeSaad with a tune. He plays one final time for Brother Eye, a swan song, "The Show Must Go On" by Queen, that blows up the merged entity Brother Eye/Apokolips, with him still trapped inside, apparently left to die. However, he is later seen alive in the streets of Gotham City, saying that if he was allowed to live for some reason, this time he will play on the side of the angels.

Final Crisis
Pied Piper returns in the Final Crisis: Rogues' Revenge mini-series. He invades the police precinct, and picks up Trickster's will, which is actually a fake that contains information on the other Rogues, written in invisible ink. Piper later steps into the middle of the fight between Inertia, Zoom and the Rogues, using his flute to paralyze the combatants, and taking the opportunity to revenge himself upon Mirror Master through a kick in the face. Before he can do anything else, Libra appears, and stabs Piper in the shoulder with his spear. Although wounded, Piper is able to contribute in the killing of Inertia by holding him in place for the Rogues using his flute. Piper is later mentioned to have turned himself into the Central City Police Department.

The New 52: The Flash and Forever Evil: Rogues Rebellion (2011–2016)
In September 2011, The New 52 rebooted DC's continuity. In this new timeline, Hartley is now the conductor of Central City's orchestra, and it is said that he is a 'reformed vigilante'. He later assists Flash and former Rogue teammate Captain Cold against the newly united Rogues.

He is in a romantic relationship with David Singh, the director of the crime lab at the Central City Police Department.

DC Rebirth: The Flash (2016–present)

Powers and abilities
A genius of sonic technology, by the age of sixteen Rathaway had crafted a sophisticated flute capable of hypnotizing anyone within range of its sound. He can make anyone do what he wants, and can even make himself 'invisible' to the perception of others. Although he focused obsessively on sound-based technology in his early years, he later expanded his scope to more general mechanical tinkering. Initially, he employed his mind control techniques almost exclusively on humans (and occasional animals), but during his incarceration in Iron Heights he became infatuated by the prison's ubiquitous rats and incorporated them into his gimmick, adding another similarity to his legendary namesake. He is able to use nearly anything that can create tones for his sonic manipulations, including touch-tone telephones and grass blade whistles. According to DeSaad, Rathaway's power is based on the manipulation of  The Anti-Life Equation. Rathaway also employs a number of devices that can generate or amplify sound for destructive or protective purposes.

Other versions

Action Comics
The first Pied Piper appears in Action Comics #48 (May, 1942). Working for the Queen Bee, the Pied Piper would play his flute, whose music would compel the VIPs that had been previously drugged by Queen Bee to follow him. He'd lead them to a hidden bunker under the ocean where Queen Bee would hold them for ransom. He was stopped by Mister America.

Earth-S
The Earth-S version of Pied Piper appears in Captain Marvel Jr. #2 and 3 (1942). This version is an enemy of Captain Marvel Jr.

Flash Comics
A version of Pied Piper appears in Flash Comics #59 (November, 1944).

Detective Comics
A version of Pied Piper appears in Detective Comics #143 (January, 1949). The Pied Piper was a criminal obsessed with every sort of pipe. He opened a pipe shop in Gotham City where he planned a series of crimes related to pipes. His activities attracted the unwanted attention of the local vigilantes Batman and Robin and the Pied Piper was eventually captured.

Mystery in Space
A version of the character named Pied Piper of Pluto appears in Mystery in Space #110 (September, 1966).

Flashpoint
In the alternate timeline of the Flashpoint event, the Pied Piper is a hero who has had his vocal cords ripped out by Citizen Cold, forcing him to rely on a cybernetic replacement. Pied Piper was also a childhood friend of Wally West. He arrives at Wally's lair and discovers that Wally has been killed by Citizen Cold. Pied Piper takes Wally's place in uncovering evidence of Citizen Cold's true identity. Pied Piper runs through the sewers and intends to rescue Iris West from the Rogues but was apparently killed by Citizen Cold's exploding ice sculpture. He was later revealed to have survived, and revealed to Iris that Citizen Cold had killed her nephew. After threatening to reveal Citizen Cold's true criminal identity, Pied Piper was briefly attacked by Citizen Cold, who was then frozen by Iris as payback for what he did to Wally.

DCeased
In the timeline depicted in DCeased, Hartley is living with David Singh in their apartment, having battling the "Anti-Living" with his powers, until they rescued by the Martian Manhunter.

In other media

Television
 An original incarnation of the Pied Piper appears in a self-titled episode of Wonder Woman, portrayed by Martin Mull. This version, Hamlin Rule, hypnotizes women to rob the venues at which he performs.
 The Pied Piper makes a non-speaking cameo appearance in the Justice League Unlimited episode "Flash and Substance".

 The Pied Piper appears in The Flash, portrayed by Andy Mientus. This version is a former employee of S.T.A.R. Labs and protégé of Dr. Harrison Wells before he was fired for attempting to expose the dangers of the latter's particle accelerator. When the accelerator exploded, Hartley's hearing was enhanced to a superhuman level, but leaves him in constant agony. In retaliation, he developed sonic-wave weaponry to exact revenge on Wells by targeting his new protégé, the Flash, as well as implants for himself that serve both as hearing aids that dull sound and as discreet weapons. Introduced in the first season episodes "The Sound and the Fury" and "Crazy for You", Rathaway initially attempts to get revenge on Wells for ruining his reputation. Though he is captured, he later manages to escape. In the second season episode, "Flash Back", the Flash travels back in time to defeat Zoom. Along the way, he prevents Rathaway's escape and joins forces with him to defeat a Time Wraith that followed the Flash through time. As a result of these timeline changes, the Flash is greeted by a reformed Rathaway when he returns to the present. In the sixth season episodes "Grodd Friended Me" and "Pay the Piper", due to changes made to the multiverse following the crossover "Crisis on Infinite Earths", Rathaway returned to being a criminal and an enemy of the Flash, who discovers that in an altered version of one of their original fights, he accidentally destabilized Rathaway's henchman/boyfriend, Roderick's, molecules. Due to this, Rathaway grew to resent the Flash ever since. After they reconcile and join forces to stop Godspeed, they are able to save Roderick.
 The Pied Piper makes a cameo appearance in The Sandman.

Film
 The Pied Piper was reportedly featured in David S. Goyer's script for a Green Arrow film project titled Escape from Super Max as an inmate of the titular Super Max Penitentiary for Metahumans.
 The Flashpoint incarnation of the Pied Piper makes a non-speaking cameo appearance in Justice League: The Flashpoint Paradox as a member of Cyborg's group who work to stop the war between Aquaman and Wonder Woman's forces.

Video games
The Pied Piper appears in DC Universe Online, voiced by Jim Canning.

Miscellaneous
 The Pied Piper appears in All-New Batman: The Brave and the Bold #16.
 The Pied Piper makes background appearances in DC Super Hero Girls as a student of Super Hero High.
 The Pied Piper appears in Injustice: Gods Among Us: Year Five #2.
 Hartley Rathaway / Pied Piper appears in Wonder Woman '77 Special #3

References

External links
 Arrowverse entry for Pied_Piper
 Gay League Profile
 Counting Down to Countdown V: Mary Marvel, Trickster, Pied Piper

Characters created by Carmine Infantino
Characters created by John Broome
Comics characters introduced in 1959
DC Comics LGBT superheroes
DC Comics LGBT supervillains
DC Comics male superheroes
DC Comics male supervillains
DC Comics orphans
Fictional deaf characters
Fictional gay males
Fictional musicians
Pied Piper of Hamelin
Flash (comics) characters